Kenneth Magidson (born April 4, 1948) is an American attorney who served as the United States Attorney for the Southern District of Texas from 2011 to 2017.

See also
2017 dismissal of U.S. attorneys

References

1948 births
Living people
United States Attorneys for the Southern District of Texas
Texas Democrats
Assistant United States Attorneys
University System of Maryland alumni
South Texas College of Law alumni
20th-century American lawyers
21st-century American lawyers